Sclerospora graminicola is a plant pathogen infecting maize and foxtail and pearl millet. Sclerospora graminicola was originally described by Saccardo in 1879 as Protomyces graminicola from infected Setaria verticillata. Schroeter examined infected Setaria viridis and determined that this species should be placed in a new genus that he named Sclerospora.  Sclerospora graminicola primarily infects C4 photosynthetic grasses of the subfamily Panicoideae, possibly due to C4 photosynthesis allowing for a greater complexity of carbohydrate substrates.

References

Peronosporales
Water mould plant pathogens and diseases
Maize diseases
Pearl millet diseases
Taxa named by Pier Andrea Saccardo